Dutuheh or Dohtuheh or Do Tuyeh or Dowpuyeh or Dotuyeh or Dutuyeh may refer to:
 Dohtuheh-ye Olya
 Dutuheh-ye Sofla